Jacobus "Ko" Matheus Willems (27 October 1900 – 28 September 1983) was a track cyclist from the Netherlands, who represented his native country at the 1924 Summer Olympics in Paris, France. There he won the gold medal in the 50 km track race.

In that Olympic race, Willems worked together with Jan Maas. Maas kept attacking from the tenth kilometer, and the other cyclists spent energy trying to reach him. In the end, 15 cyclists remained, and Willems, who was the better sprinter, won the race.

See also
 List of Dutch Olympic cyclists

References

External links

  Dutch Olympic Committee

1900 births
1983 deaths
Dutch male cyclists
Cyclists at the 1924 Summer Olympics
Olympic cyclists of the Netherlands
Olympic gold medalists for the Netherlands
Cyclists from Amsterdam
Dutch track cyclists
Olympic medalists in cycling
Medalists at the 1924 Summer Olympics
20th-century Dutch people